The Samsung SCH-U750, marketed as Samsung Alias 2 and also as Samsung Zeal, is a cell phone made by Samsung. The phone is only available in metallic gray. It features a dual-hinge design that can be opened in portrait or landscape style. Arguably, the most notable feature of the Alias 2 is its E Ink-based keyboard.  In horizontal mode it features a QWERTY keyboard and VCAST music on the Verizon Wireless network within Australia and the USA.

The phone runs on Verizon Wireless's digital and Ev-DO networks. The Samsung Alias 2 was released on 11 May 2009 in the United States.

Features 

Its external features are a postage stamp sized front display, touch sensitive music control buttons and a 2.0-megapixel camera. On the right side there is the power button, a "hold" button, and a microSD card slot. On the left, there is a Voice Activation button, an up/down volume rocker button, a headphone jack, and proprietary charger/data transfer port. Opened in portrait or call mode, a standard numerical dialing pad along with two soft keys, send and end keys, a camera button, a voice command button, and four-directional buttons with an OK key in the center are all available. When in portrait, a user could input text using T9 (predictive text) or flip the phone horizontally for its full keyboard. The phone's 2.0 megapixel camera can take up to 1200 x 1600, and can record video at 176 x 144 at 15fps for the maximum of 10 minutes. The user could also use features in the camera like Night Shot, multi-shot, panorama, self-timer, and various filters. The smaller 128 x 128 1.3 inch display would also display what the camera would be showing when taking pictures of yourself. Opened horizontally, the full QWERTY keypad is usable and a simple button press allows switching between the various alphanumeric functions. Stereo speakers are mounted on either side of the 2.6-inch TFT display, with a resolution of 240 x 320 (QVGA). The battery is 880 mAh which will give you 5 hours of talk time and 14 days stand-by. It had basic features, such as a tip calculator, alarm, calendar, voice memos, and a music player, which supported the MP3, WMA, ACC, and ACC+ formats, and could be controlled by the three touch sensitive buttons on the front of the display when the phone is closed. However, it lacked standard hardware that other manufactures were using at the time, such as micro USB and a 3.5mm headphone jack. It also had a built-in e-mail client that was compatible with Yahoo!, Windows Live, AOL, Verizon.net, and POP. It also supported Mobile IM through AIM, Windows Live Messenger, and Yahoo Messenger. The u750 is compatible with all Verizon services, such as VCAST. It is also equipped with voice recognition, text message dictation, and two flash-based display themes, as well as the standard red Verizon Wireless themes.
The phone was discontinued in October 2010.

Series
The Samsung Alias 2 was the successor of the original Samsung Alias, which did not feature the unique "magic" e-ink display. The keys were cramped up with all the functions of the e-ink display, which disappointed many users. After the Alias 2, the Samsung Zeal took over. The complete phone is unchanged from Alias 2 to the Zeal, except for the shape of the camera, which changed from a square to an oval and the color is changed to black.

References

External links 
 Samsung Alias 2 (SCH-u750)

SCH-u750
Mobile phones introduced in 2009
Electronic paper technology